"Runnin' Wild" is a popular song first composed and recorded in 1922, written by Arthur Harrington Gibbs with lyrics by Joe Grey and Leo Wood.

Notable recordings

Further albums and tours (2012–present) 

Original Memphis Five, recorded in December 1922 for Regal Records (catalog No. 9407A).
Nora Bayes - recorded for Columbia Records (catalog No. A3826) on January 11, 1923.
Ted Lewis - a popular recording in 1922.
Django Reinhardt Quintette - a gypsy swing version in 1937
Duke Ellington and His Orchestra, recorded October 17, 1930 for Brunswick Records (catalog No. E34927).
Jimmie Lunceford and His Orchestra, recorded on May 29, 1935 for Decca Records (catalog No. 503B).
Benny Goodman Quartet, recorded February 5, 1937 for Victor Records (25529A).
Glenn Miller and His Orchestra (1939).
Ted Weems and His Orchestra, recorded for Decca Records (3135A) on October 4, 1939.
Teddy Wilson Quintet, recorded January 15, 1945 for Musicraft Records (catalog No. 319).
The Chordettes - A single release in 1951.
Firehouse Five Plus Two - for their album Firehouse Five Plus Two Volume 4 (1952).
Joyce Bryant released a version of the song in 1954. It also served as the title of her album.
Ella Fitzgerald - A swing version is included on the 1962 Verve recording: Ella Fitzgerald: Rhythm Is My Business with a fabulous big band arrangement by Bill Doggett.
The Temperance Seven - a single release in 1962 (7" Parlophone R4934).
The New Paul Whiteman Orchestra - for their album The New Paul Whiteman Orchestra (1975).
Boston Pops Orchestra CD Runnin' Wild: The Boston Pops Orchestra Plays Glenn Miller (1986). This was Keith Lockhart's first CD with the Boston Pops as their 20th Conductor.

In popular culture
It is probably best known for its inclusion in the classic 1959 comedy film Some Like It Hot, set in the late Prohibition era. The song is performed during a rehearsal on a train journey, with Marilyn Monroe providing the vocals.

It was also used as introductory music on two early sound short films starring Laurel and Hardy (Men O' War and They Go Boom, both 1929) before their celebrated theme tune The Ku-Ku Song was composed. This song was used for the beginning of the Our Gang shorts The Holy Terror and Moan & Groan, Inc.

Woody Allen included the song in his film Zelig (1983) when the version by The Charleston City All Stars was used.

The song was also used in the 1988 film The Fruit Machine. and in the 1990 film Miller's Crossing''.

It was used in an advertising campaign for Prada "Candy" perfume in 2011.

References

1922 songs
Marilyn Monroe songs
Songs written by Leo Wood